Lieutenant General James Ian Bashall,  (born 3 April 1962) is a former British Army officer who served as Commander Home Command from 2015 to 2018. Since 2019, he has been  National President of the Royal British Legion.

Early life and education
Bashall was born on 3 April 1962 in Marlborough, Wiltshire, England. He was educated at Marlborough College, a private boarding school.

Military career
Bashall was commissioned in to the Parachute Regiment in 1984. By 2002 he had become Commanding Officer of the 2nd Battalion The Parachute Regiment serving in Afghanistan.

He commanded 1st Mechanized Brigade based in Basra in Southern Iraq during Operation Telic in 2007. He was appointed Director Army Division of the Defence Academy at Shrivenham in January 2009 and went on to be Chief of Joint Force Operations in December 2009: in this capacity he masterminded the covert Special Air Service rescue operations across war-torn Libya in early 2011. He became General Officer Commanding 1st (UK) Armoured Division in April 2011, Chief of Staff, Operations at the Permanent Joint Headquarters, Northwood in August 2012 and Commander Personnel and Support Command in June 2015 (his role was re-designated Commander Home Command in May 2016). Bashall retired from the British Army on 27 October 2018.

Later life
Bashall was appointed as the National President of the Royal British Legion in May 2019. When appointed, Bashall said "It is an honour to be appointed as the National President of The Royal British Legion, a charity with an esteemed history, and one that plays a vital role in today’s Armed Forces community." He will serve in his position until May 2022.

References

|-
 

British Army lieutenant generals
People educated at Marlborough College
Commanders of the Order of the British Empire
British Parachute Regiment officers
Living people
British Army personnel of the Iraq War
British Army personnel of the War in Afghanistan (2001–2021)
Companions of the Order of the Bath
Military personnel from Wiltshire
1962 births
People from Marlborough, Wiltshire